Ioannis Vrettos was a Greek long-distance runner.  He competed at the 1896 Summer Olympics in Athens.

Vrettos was one of 17 athletes to start the marathon race.  He finished fourth of the nine athletes who completed the race.

References

External links

Year of birth missing
Year of death missing
Athletes (track and field) at the 1896 Summer Olympics
19th-century sportsmen
Olympic athletes of Greece
Greek male marathon runners
Greek male long-distance runners
Place of birth missing
Place of death missing